Jorge Garbey (born 27 March 1953) is a Cuban fencer. He competed at the 1972 and 1976 Summer Olympics.

References

1953 births
Living people
Cuban male fencers
Olympic fencers of Cuba
Fencers at the 1972 Summer Olympics
Fencers at the 1976 Summer Olympics
Pan American Games medalists in fencing
Pan American Games gold medalists for Cuba
Fencers at the 1975 Pan American Games
20th-century Cuban people
21st-century Cuban people